Lukas Grill may refer to:

 Lukas Grill (footballer, born 1993), German football defender
 Lukas Grill (footballer, born 1991), Austrian football midfielder